Svetlana Anatolyevna Kazanina (born 31 October 1971 in Taldykorgan, Kazakh SSR) is a Kazakhstani heptathlete.

Achievements

External links
 
sports-reference

1971 births
Living people
People from Taldykorgan
Kazakhstani heptathletes
Athletes (track and field) at the 1996 Summer Olympics
Athletes (track and field) at the 2000 Summer Olympics
Athletes (track and field) at the 2004 Summer Olympics
Olympic athletes of Kazakhstan
Asian Games medalists in athletics (track and field)
Athletes (track and field) at the 1994 Asian Games
Athletes (track and field) at the 1998 Asian Games
Athletes (track and field) at the 2002 Asian Games
Asian Games silver medalists for Kazakhstan
Asian Games bronze medalists for Kazakhstan
Medalists at the 1998 Asian Games
Kazakhstani people of Russian descent